An annular solar eclipse occurred on April 19, 1939. A solar eclipse occurs when the Moon passes between Earth and the Sun, thereby totally or partly obscuring the image of the Sun for a viewer on Earth. An annular solar eclipse occurs when the Moon's apparent diameter is smaller than the Sun's, blocking most of the Sun's light and causing the Sun to look like an annulus (ring). An annular eclipse appears as a partial eclipse over a region of the Earth thousands of kilometres wide.

This annular eclipse is notable in that the path of annularity passed over the North Pole. Land covered in the path include part of Alaska, Canada, and Franz Josef Land, Ushakov Island and Vize Island in the Soviet Union (today's Russia). This was the umbral eclipse number 56 out of 57 of Solar Saros 118, this is the last central solar eclipse, and the penultimate umbral eclipse, with last (ultimate) in 1957.

Related eclipses

Solar eclipses 1939–1942

Saros 118 

It is a part of Saros cycle 118, repeating every 18 years, 11 days, containing 72 events. The series started with partial solar eclipse on May 24, 803 AD. It contains total eclipses from August 19, 947 AD through October 25, 1650, hybrid eclipses on November 4, 1668, and November 15, 1686, and annular eclipses from November 27, 1704, through April 30, 1957. The series ends at member 72 as a partial eclipse on July 15, 2083. The longest duration of total was 6 minutes, 59 seconds on May 16, 1398.

Metonic series

Notes

References

1939 4 19
1939 4 19
1939 in science
April 1939 events